is a passenger railway station located in the city of Matsuyama, Ehime Prefecture, Japan. It is operated by the private transportation company Iyotetsu.

Lines

Layout
The station consists of one island platform with a level crossing. In the event of an emergency, such as an accident resulting in injury or death, the Yokogawara Line will turn back at this station or Kume Station. During most of the day, trains arrive every fifteen minutes. Trains continue from Matsuyama City Station on the Takahama Line to Takahama Station.

History
Umenomoto Station was opened on March 1, 1935. On May 11, 1981 the staton was moved 168 meters in the direction of Yokogawara.

Surrounding area
Akusha River
Minamiumemoto Park
Minamiumemoto assembly hall
National Hospital Organization Shikoku Cancer Center

See also
 List of railway stations in Japan

References

External links

Iyotetsu Station Information

Iyotetsu Yokogawara Line
Railway stations in Ehime Prefecture
Railway stations in Japan opened in 1935
Railway stations in Matsuyama, Ehime